Kim Rew (born 26 June 1975) is a South African sailor. She competed in the Yngling event at the 2008 Summer Olympics.

References

External links
 

1975 births
Living people
South African female sailors (sport)
Olympic sailors of South Africa
Sailors at the 2008 Summer Olympics – Yngling
Sportspeople from Pietermaritzburg